Connor Sully (born 24 October 2000) is an Australian cricketer. He made his List A debut on 13 October 2021, for Queensland in the 2021–22 Marsh One-Day Cup. Prior to his List A debut, he was named in Australia's squad for the 2020 Under-19 Cricket World Cup. He made his first-class debut on 27 October 2021, for Queensland in the 2021–22 Sheffield Shield season.

References

External links
 

2000 births
Living people
Australian cricketers
Queensland cricketers
Cricketers from Brisbane